Crna Gora is the native name of Montenegro.

Crna Gora (i.e. black mountain in Serbo-Croatian and Macedonian) may also refer to:

 Užička Crna Gora, region in western Serbia
 Skopska Crna Gora, mountainous region on the Serbian–Macedonian border
 Banatska Crna Gora, region in western Romania
 Radio Crna Gora, radio station in Montenegro

See also 
 Montenegro (disambiguation)
 Mali i Zi (disambiguation)
 Black Mountain (disambiguation)

Serbo-Croatian place names
Macedonian place names